Podlas may refer to:
Cities in Poland
 Podlas, Lublin Voivodeship
 Podlas, Łódź Voivodeship
People
 Kuzma Podlas, Soviet general